Life with Louie is an American animated sitcom television series that ran on the FOX Network from 1994-1998. The series was based on the childhood of well-known stand-up comedian Louie Anderson, growing up with his family in the town of Cedar Knoll, Wisconsin during the early 1960s, although Anderson himself was actually from Saint Paul, Minnesota, also situated in midwestern U.S.

The first two episodes aired in primetime on Fox in late 1994, before moving to Saturday morning on Fox Kids from 1995 to 1998.

Ownership of the series passed to Disney in 2001 when Disney acquired Fox Kids Worldwide. The series is not available on Disney+.

Characters
 Louis "Louie" Anderson (voiced by Louie Anderson) — Based on Anderson's younger self. Louie is an 8-year-old child, living in the fictional town of Cedar Knoll, Wisconsin. He is a very sensitive, impressionable, and intelligent young boy. He often uses his gifted sense of humor to deal with difficult situations. He always stands up for his own rights and principles, but also for those of others. His most notable catchphrase used in the series is, "All right!"
 Jeannie Harper (voiced by Debi Derryberry) — Louie's best friend. She often defends Louie from local bullies. Louie has a crush on her.
 Michael "Mike" Grunewald (voiced by Justin Shenkarow) — Louie's friend with a sarcastic sense of humor. He has a somewhat relaxed attitude and comes from a rather wealthy family, much to Louie's jealousy.
 Toddler Tobolinski — Louie's other friend. He is somewhat shorter than the others, about the same height as Louie, and loves activities like recess.
 Scott Jensen — One of Louie's friends. He appears quite often in the first and third seasons, but is rarely seen in Season 2.
 Andrew "Andy" Mortimer Anderson (voiced by Louie Anderson) — Louie's difficult, but caring father. He is a veteran of World War II and likes to tell his family stories about his experience at the front in Europe. Much of the humor regarding Andy involved his comic superiority complex and equally comical unawareness of his own limitations. Though he often appeared out of touch with reality, Andy was secretly a very gifted chess player, a skill Louie was briefly shown to have himself, but he hid his gift during the latter half of his life because of the way he was supposedly mistreated for it in his youth (even going so far as to disguise himself at chess tournaments so he wouldn't be recognized). He is a proud owner of a Rambler sedan (most probably a 1959 Rambler Six), which appears on the show in various episodes. His catchphrases: "For crying out loud!" and "I heard that." Despite his appearance, he is a very caring and loving person.
 Ora Anderson (voiced by Edie McClurg) — Louie's kind, loving and sweet natured mother. She usually acts as the voice of reason for Louie and Andy.
 Thomas "Tommy" Anderson (voiced by Miko Hughes) — Louie's youngest brother. Louie teases him a lot in the beginning.
 Glen Glenn (voiced by Justin Shenkarow) — The local bully of Louie's school who teases Louie and the other kids. His mother Jen Glenn has a hot temper and loud voice which the other citizens don't like.
 Craig Eric, Paul George — Glen Glenn's friends.
 The Melvins — A group of chess nerds. One of them is actually named Franklin, but is still called Melvin.
 Henrietta Shermann (voiced by Mary Wickes) — The mother of Ora and maternal grandmother of Louie. When her voice actress Mary Wickes died in Season 2, the producers elected to make an episode where Louie handles the death of his grandmother.
 Pepper — Louie's obese pet goldfish.
 Sid Anderson, John Anderson, Danny Anderson, Peter Anderson — Louie's older brothers.
 Mr. Jensen, Earl Grunewald, Gus Williams, Mrs. Stillman — Louie's neighbors.
 Laura Anderson, Carol Anderson, Charlie Anderson, Julie Anderson — Louie's older sisters.

Episode list

Specials

Season 1 (1995–1996)

Season 2 (1996–1997)

Season 3 (1997–1998)

Intro and theme song
The show's intro for Seasons 2 and 3 involved the main character running toward a TV set, turning one of the set's dials, and showing a live-action video of Louie Anderson as an adult saying, "Let me tell you about my family." This was followed by clips of the show from Andy Anderson being pulled by sled dogs, Louie sticking chopsticks in his nose, to Louie jumping off a diving board at a swimming pool nearly wasting all the water and getting most of the other participants wet due to the fact of him being overweight. Then the show's logo (in pink) appeared on the bottom left-hand corner of the screen, while the main character (wearing sunglasses) ate a dot while sitting on a raft while watching TV on a tire. Season 1 episodes used a live-action intro by Louie Anderson talking to the audience about his childhood, then dissolving into the show.

Home videos and merchandise
Based on the popularity of the show, various merchandise was released including apparel, videos of various episodes, a "Lake Winnibigoshish" CD-ROM comic book, and a book series for children. The book series was based on the various episodes of the show and contained six books in total. Kids' meal toys were also produced for several fast-food restaurant chains including Taco Bell (1996), Hardee's (1997), Jack in the Box (1997), and Dairy Queen (1999).

For a time, Life with Louie-branded SpaghettiOs, in character shapes, were available.

In early January 2006, TVShowsOnDVD.com posted a news story that Life with Louie was going to be released on DVD in the US. The information came from Louie Anderson himself who mentioned this news on a radio program he was a guest on, KQRS-FM. There has been no other news since then and it is now unknown if this series will ever be released on DVD in the United States since Louie Anderson's death in 2022. However, three 2-episode sets were released in the United Kingdom in summer 2007 as Life with Louie: Volume 1, 2, and 3. The sets were released through Boulevard Entertainment as part of the Jetix programming brand.

Awards
The series won two Emmy Awards. It also won the Humanitas Prize three times, which is more than for any other animated series.
 Emmy Award for Outstanding Sound Editing - Special Class - Rick Hinson, Rick Hammel, Les Wolf Thomas Syslo and Timothy Borquez - 1996 (nominated)
 Emmy Award for Outstanding Sound Mixing - Special Class - Timothy Borquez and Dan Hiland - 1996 (nominated)
 Emmy Award for Outstanding Performer in an Animated Program - Louie Anderson - 1997
 Emmy Award for Outstanding Performer in an Animated Program - Louie Anderson - 1998
 Emmy Award for Outstanding Sound Mixing - Special Class - Timothy Borquez, Timothy J. Garrity and Brad Brock - 1998 (nominated)
 Emmy Award for Outstanding Outstanding Sound Editing - Special Class - Timothy Borquez, Rick Hinson and Eric Freeman - 1998 (nominated)
 Emmy Award for Outstanding Performer in an Animated Program - Louie Anderson - 1999 (nominated)
 Emmy Award for Outstanding Special Class Animated Program - 1999 (nominated)
 Genesis Award for ethical treatment of animals - 1997
 Humanitas Prize for Children's Animation - 1996
 Humanitas Prize for Children's Animation - 1997
 Humanitas Prize for Children's Animation - 1998

References

External links
 

1994 American television series debuts
1998 American television series endings
1990s American animated television series
American children's animated comedy television series
Animated television series about children
American television series with live action and animation
English-language television shows
Fox Broadcasting Company original programming
Fox Kids
Television series by 20th Century Fox Television
Television series by Fox Television Animation
Television series by Hyperion Pictures
Television series by Saban Entertainment
Television series set in the 1960s
Television shows set in Wisconsin